Ingmar De Vos (born 5 August 1963) is a Belgian professional sports manager serving as the thirteenth and current President of the International Federation for Equestrian Sports (Fédération Equestre Internationale) (FEI). Educated in sports management, business administration and international law, he began his career in mainstream politics before working for the Belgian Equestrian Federation and supported that nation's equestrian teams at the Olympics and the FEI World Equestrian Games.  He was one of the founders of the European Equestrian Federation and became secretary-general of the FEI in 2011 prior to being elected President of the organisation in 2014.

Education and Career 
Studying at Vrije Universiteit Brussel (V.U.B), De Vos began his university education gaining master's degrees in Political Science (department International Relations) and International and European Law. He also studied business administration and later went on to gain further degrees including Sports Management from the Belgian Olympic Academy.

Following completion of his Masters in International and European law, De Vos joined the Belgian Senate, as an advisor to the Liberal Group.

Equestrian organisation management career 
Ingmar De Vos began his career within Equestrian Sports Management in 1990 at the Belgian Equestrian Federation, first taking on the role of Managing Director which was later combined with the Secretary General role.  In his time at the Belgian Equestrian, De Vos was successful in modernising the organisation and administration including the restructuring of the organisation to allow the regional federations to receive government funding.

Alongside his core responsibilities as Managing Director and Secretary General, De Vos was also Head of the Belgian Equestrian Delegation at the Olympic Games from 2000-2008 in Sydney, Athens and Beijing as well as heading up the Belgian Delegation at the first five FEI World Equestrian Games between 1990 and 2010. He is also on the board of the Belgian National Olympic Committee.

He was co-founder of the European Equestrian Federation (EEF) in 2010 and was also Secretary General from 2010 until 2011, when he joined the Fédération Equestre Internationale (FEI), world governing body for horse sport.

From 2011 to 2014, Ingmar De Vos became Secretary General of the FEI which headquarters are based in Lausanne (SUI) he was elected FEI President in Baku (AZE) in 2014 and re-elected for a second four-year term in Manama (BRN) in 2018.

Since 2017, Ingmar De Vos is Member of the International Olympic Committee (IOC), where he is currently member of three Commissions, the Legal Affairs Commission since 2018, the Women in Sport Commission and the Los Angeles 2028 Coordination Commission both since 2019. He also served in the past as a member of the Digital and Technology Commission (2018-2019).

He is a member of the Association of Summer Olympic International Federations (ASOIF) Governance Task Force since 2016 and became an ASOIF Council Member in April 2019.

In early November 2018 he was appointed to the Global Association of International Sports Federations (GAISF) Council and, since 2018,  as the GAISF representative on the 12-member World Anti-Doping Agency (WADA) Executive Committee. He became the ASOIF representative on the WADA Executive Committee and Foundation Board in 2018.

In March 2017, he became a UN International Gender Champions (IGC), joining a leadership network that brings together female and male decision-makers determined to break down gender barriers and make gender equality a working reality in their spheres of influence.

In 2014, Ingmar De Vos became Vice-President of the International Horse Sports Confederation (IHSC), an umbrella body created by the FEI and the International Federation of Horseracing Authorities (IFHA) – the first formal vehicle for cooperation between the world’s leading governing bodies for equestrian sport. He served as IHSC President from December 2019 to April 2022, and will once again take on the role of IHSC Vice-President for a two year period.

Fédération Equestre Internationale 

Ingmar De Vos joined the FEI as Secretary General in 2011 during the second presidential term of HRH Princess Haya. During his time as Secretary General he worked closely with HRH Princess Haya, implementing a number of reforms to improve lines of communication with the National Federations and stakeholders. One of the key steps in this process was the creation of the FEI Sports Forum in 2012 to provide a platform for all stakeholders to discuss matters relating to the sport in an open and transparent manner.

He was also instrumental in the restructuring of FEI's Commercial strategy which subsequently resulted in the signing of the organisation's biggest commercial deal with the Swiss watchmakers, Longines.

Following the decision of FEI President HRH Princess Haya not to run for a third term, Ingmar De Vos stepped forward as one of six candidates. The Presidential election took place at the 2014 FEI General Assembly in Baku, Azerbaijan where De Vos was elected in the first round of voting. A total of 131 National Federations voted:

Note: The two other candidates, Ulf Helgstrand (DEN) and Javier Revuelta del Peral (ESP) withdrew from the election process prior to the vote.

Ingmar De Vos' Presidential manifesto focused on five main pillars: "Serving our community", "Sport: our core business", "Equestrian Sport in the Olympics", "FEI Solidarity" and "Horses as our Partners". These five pillars will serve as his blueprint for the four-year presidential term. De Vos' manifesto speech prior to his election can be seen here.

As FEI President, De Vos has been very active; he attended Australian Sport Achievement Awards Night in July 2015 and in the same month visited the Bulgarian Federation Summer Camp supported by FEI Solidarity. Watch the FEI Reportage to learn more about the 4 pillars of FEI Solidary. On 7 December, an FEI delegation composed of Ingmar De Vos, Sabrina Ibáñez, FEI Secretary General, John Madden, FEI 1st Vice-President and Chair of the Jumping Committee and Frank Kemperman, Member of the Executive Board and Chair of the Dressage Committee were received at Al-Safriya Palace by His Royal Highness Prince Salman bin Hamad Al Khalifa. De Vos presented King Hamad's with the first FEI Decoration in recognition of his pioneering role and dedicated efforts to promote the equestrian sport, preserve its heritage and support FEI governing body.

On 20 November 2018, during its General Assembly held in Manama (BRN), Ingmar De Vos, uncontested candidate, was re-elected as FEI President for a four-year terms.,. In a powerful acceptance speech. after an extended standing ovation from the delegates, De Vos once again expressed his belief in “our sport, in our community and in our potential”. He continued by saying that these are exciting times for equestrian, with a fan base which is clearly diversifying, and seven unique disciplines to promote concluding with, “the sky really is the limit!”

International Olympic Committee 
On 15 September 2017, Ingmar was elected as a Member of the International Olympic Committee (IOC) during the IOC Session in Lima, he is currently member of two Commissions, the Legal Affairs Commission and the Los Angeles 2028 Coordination Commission, while he has also served in the past as a member of the Digital and Technology Commission.

Ingmar De Vos is a member of the Governance Task Force set up by the Association of Summer Olympic International Federations (ASOIF) in 2016. and since April 2019 he is also an ASOIF Council Member.

In early November 2018 he was appointed to the Global Association of International Sports Federations (GAISF) Council and as the GAISF representative on the 12-member World Anti-Doping Agency (WADA) Executive Committee. As of 1 January 2020, he became the ASOIF representative on the WADA Executive Committee and Foundation Board. He is also on the board of the Belgian National Olympic Committee. In December 2021, he was appointed Sport Accord, Executive Committee Member representing Global Association of International Sports Federations GAISF.

References

External links 
 FEI.org
 FEITV.org
 FEI Database

Equestrian organizations
1963 births
Living people
International Federation for Equestrian Sports
International Olympic Committee members